Christopher Earl Piersoll (born September 25, 1977) is a former pitcher in Major League Baseball. He played for the Cincinnati Reds.

References

External links

1977 births
Living people
Major League Baseball pitchers
Cincinnati Reds players
Baseball players from California
Fullerton Hornets baseball players
American expatriate baseball players in Canada
American expatriate baseball players in Mexico
Arizona League Cubs players
Bowie Baysox players
Chattanooga Lookouts players
Daytona Cubs players
Frederick Keys players
Guerreros de Oaxaca players
Ottawa Lynx players
Rockford Cubbies players
West Tennessee Diamond Jaxx players